Symbiosis School, Nashik is a high school in Nashik, India.

Established in 1999, the school is run by the Symbiosis Society. It is a CBSE (Delhi Board) school and is located in Ashwin Nagar.

The school consists of a kindergarten and a secondary school. The Secondary school is headed by Mrs. Surinder Harjit Sabharwal and Kindergarten is headed by Mrs Yogini Deshmukh.
 

Educational institutions established in 1999
High schools and secondary schools in Maharashtra
Schools in Nashik
Symbiosis Society
1999 establishments in Maharashtra